Infinity is an album by jazz trumpeter Lee Morgan released on the Blue Note label. It was recorded on November 16, 1965 but not released until 1981 and features performances by Morgan with a quintet featuring Jackie McLean, Larry Willis, Reggie Workman and Billy Higgins. The album was reissued on CD in 1998 as a limited edition.

Reception
The Allmusic review by Scott Yanow awarded the album 4 stars stating "The music (four Morgan and one McLean originals), even while being tied to the hard bop tradition, is challenging and (with the exception of the closing uptempo blues "Zip Code") quite tricky; really inspiring the talented players. An underrated gem.".

Track listing 
All compositions by Lee Morgan except where noted
 "Infinity" - 11:42
 "Miss Nettie B." - 9:20
 "Growing Pains" - 8:06
 "Portrait of Doll" (McLean) - 5:42
 "Zip Code" - 6:31

Personnel 
 Lee Morgan - trumpet
 Jackie McLean - alto saxophone
 Larry Willis - piano
 Reggie Workman - bass
 Billy Higgins - drums

References 

Hard bop albums
Lee Morgan albums
1981 albums
Blue Note Records albums
Albums produced by Alfred Lion
Albums recorded at Van Gelder Studio